The Hungarian composer Béla Bartók wrote six string quartets, for two violins, viola and cello:

List
 String Quartet No. 1 (1909), Op.7, Sz. 40, BB 52
 String Quartet No. 2 (1917), Op.17, Sz. 67, BB 75
 String Quartet No. 3 (1927), Sz. 85, BB 93
 String Quartet No. 4 (1928), Sz. 91, BB 95
 String Quartet No. 5 (1934), Sz. 102, BB 110
 String Quartet No. 6 (1939), Sz. 114, BB 119

Posterity 
Notable composers who have been influenced by them include:
 Benjamin Britten, particularly in the Sonata in C for Cello and Piano
 Elliott Carter, who refers in the opening of his own First String Quartet to Bartók's Sixth Quartet
 Chen Yi
 Edison Denisov, whose Second Quartet is closely related to Bartók's Fifth Quartet
 Franco Donatoni, who was deeply impressed when he heard a broadcast of Bartók's Fourth Quartet
 Robert Fripp, who mentions them as an influence on the band King Crimson
 Miloslav Ištvan
 György Kurtág, whose Opp. 1 and 28 both owe a great deal to Bartók's quartets
 György Ligeti, whose two string quartets both owe a great deal to Bartók's quartets
 Bruno Maderna
 George Perle, who credits the Bartók Fourth and Fifth Quartets as precedents for his use of arrays of chords related to one another by different types of symmetry
 Walter Piston
 Steve Reich, who described them in an interview as "the greatest set of quartets since Beethoven"
 Kim Dzmitrïyevich Tsesakow
 
 Stefan Wolpe, who explained in a public lecture how he had derived ideas from Bartók's Fourth Quartet
 Xu Yongsan

Recordings 
Key recordings of the complete cycle include:
 Emerson String Quartet, Deutsche Grammophon, released 1990.
 Hagen Quartet
 Juilliard String Quartet:
 Recorded 1949, New York. Robert Mann and Robert Koff, violins; Raphael Hillyer, viola; Arthur Winograd, cello. Three LPs, 12 in., monaural. Columbia Masterworks ML 4278/4279/4280.
 Recorded May and September, 1963, Columbia 30th Street Studios, New York. Robert Mann and Isidore Cohen, violins; Raphael Hillyer, viola; Claus Adam, cello. Three LPs, 12 in., stereo. Columbia Masterworks D3L 317 (set): ML 6102, 6103, 6104. New York: Columbia Masterworks, 1965.
 Recorded 13–23 May 1981, Columbia 30th Street Studios, New York. Robert Mann and Earl Carlyss, violins; Samuel Rhodes, viola; Claus Adam, cello.
 Lindsay String Quartet
 Takács Quartet, Decca 289 455 297-2. Released 1998.

See also
 List of compositions by Béla Bartók

References

Sources

External links
 Performance guide, Bartók Quartet

 
Lists of string quartets by composer
Lists of compositions by composer